Indian Bank Recreational Club, also known as FC Indian Bank, is an Indian professional football club based in Chennai, Tamil Nadu. The club formerly participated in the National Football League, and the I-League Second Division, alongside the Chennai Football League under license from Tamil Nadu Football Association (TNFA).

The club was managed by former India international, Syed Sabir Pasha, who also captained the team since their inception. Indian Bank also participated in the National Football League II, and National Football League III.

History

Formation and early years
Founded in 1907 as an Indian state-owned financial services company, Indian Bank established as a premier bank in the state of Tamil Nadu, and considering the popularity and passion towards the game of football at the region, Indian Bank decided to launch a team of its own and register it with Tamil Nadu Football Association (TNFA). Thus the club was founded on the name Indian Bank Sporta and Recreational Club in 1990.

In 1996, Indian Bank participated in the Scissors Cup, held in Kerala and reached the final. They finished as runners-up as Dempo clinched title defeating them 1–0.

Since then, Indian bank began participating in TNFA and CFA conducted tournaments like Vittal Trophy, Chennai Universal Cup, and TFA Shield.

NFL journey
The club began their journey in the National Football League (India) in 1996, which was the inaugural season. Jayantilal Jain, the president of Indian Bank Recreational Club, made a compact team for 1996–97 NFL season. The team registered a 4–1 win against Mahindra United FC, which becomes the biggest away win in that season. The club later relegated from the NFL in 1999 after finishing at the bottom of the Group-B.

The club also competed in the I-League Second Division for a long time and in 2001–02, they declared as the joint-champions. In the 2003–04 NFL season, the club again relegated.

Later years

Winning trophies

In 1998, Indian Bank clinched their first knock-out title Lal Bahadur Shastri Cup, defeating Delhi Blues XI 2–1.

In February 2000, they again emerged victorious in Tirur All-India Football Tournament in Kerala, beating Goan side Vasco SC 5–4.

In January 2008, Indian Bank beat Reserve Bank of India 1–0 to win the Fr.Gerard Rolling Football Trophy. It was held at DBYC grounds, Basin Bridge, Chennai.

Regional leagues

TNFA and CFA titles
Indian Bank began participating in regional league tournaments in Tamil Nadu since its inception. In the Chennai Super League, they clinched title twice in 1997 and 1998. In 2005 season, they achieved third place. In Tamil Nadu State League knock-out tournaments, Indian Bank won titles thrice in 2004, 2005–06 and 2007 season.

In 2016, Chennai City FC became the second club from Tamil Nadu to play in the top division I-League after Indian Bank Recreational Club's entry in the National Football League.

In 2018, the club emerged as the champions of the CFA Senior Division league.

After a long hiatus between TNFA and CFA, the 2021–22 Chennai Senior Division kicked off on 9 May 2022 with 10 teams competing for the title, and Indian Bank achieved fifth place.

Rivalries
In CFA Senior Division, the club has a rivalry with Chennai City FC. The club has also a rivalry with local sides like Integral Coach Factory (ICF FC), Chennai Customs SC and Hindustan Eagles.

Stadium

Indian Bank used Jawaharlal Nehru Stadium (also known as Marina Arena) in Chennai as their home ground since 1996, which has a capacity of 40,000 spectators. They also played some state-league matches at the Nehru Stadium of Coimbatore.

Ownership

Past internationals
The players below had senior international cap(s) for their respective countries. Players whose name is listed, represented their countries before or after playing for Indian Bank RC.
  Kasun Jayasuriya (2001–2002)
  Kamaldeen Fuard (2000–2001)
  Anton Silva (1998–1999)
  Stanley Festus (2000–2002)

Honours

National 
 I-League Second Division
Champions (1): 2001–02
National Football League II
Runners-up (1): 2001–02
 National Football League III 
Champions (1): 2006–07
 Chennai Football League
Champions (6): 1997, 1998, 2000–01, 2002–03, 2007–08, 2017–18
Runners-up (1): 2004
Third place (1): 2005
 Tamil Nadu State League
Champions (3): 2004, 2005–06, 2007

Others 
 Fr.Gerard Rolling Football Trophy
Winners (1): 2008
 Vittal Trophy
Winners (1): 1990
Lal Bahadur Shastri Cup
Winners (1): 1998
 Tirur All-India Football Tournament
Champions (1): 2000
 Sikkim Governor's Gold Cup
Runners-up (1): 1990
 Scissors Cup
Runners-up (1): 1996

See also

 List of football clubs in Chennai
 Sport in Chennai
 Financial services association football clubs in India
 Defunct football clubs in India

Notes

References

Further reading

External links
Indian Bank Recreational Club at Soccerway
Indian Bank Recreational Club at WorldFootball.net
Indian Bank Recreational Club at betexplorer.com
Indian Bank Recreational Club at Everything for Football

Financial services association football clubs in India
Association football clubs established in 1996
Defunct football clubs in India
I-League clubs
1996 establishments in Tamil Nadu
Football clubs in Chennai